The Caproni Trento F.5 was a small Italian two-seat trainer designed by Stelio Frati and built by Aeroplani Caproni Trento.  The F.5 was not ordered into production and only a prototype was built.

Design and development
By the 1950s the Caproni company had collapsed and could not survive the postwar economic problems. One of the few group members to continue working was Aeroplane Caproni Trento, based at Gardola in Trento. Originally involved with aircraft maintenance and support, the company decided to design and build a small jet trainer in 1951. The F.5 aircraft was designed by Stelio Frati based on his earlier glider work. It was a low-wing all-wood monoplane with retractable tricycle landing gear. The engine was a small Turbomeca Palas turbojet located in the fuselage. It had two inlet ducts, one either side of the fuselage and the exhaust was below the rear fuselage. It had an enclosed cabin with tandem seating for an instructor and student and was fitted with a jettisonable canopy.

The F.5 made its maiden flight on 20 May 1952. It was the first jet aircraft developed in postwar Italy. Although evaluated by the Italian Air Force it gained little interest and was not ordered into production.

Operators

Italian Air Force one aircraft for evaluation test

Aircraft on display
The prototype, registered I-FACT, and only F.5 is on display at the Museo dell'Aeronautica Gianni Caproni in Trento.

Specifications

References

Notes

Bibliography

  

Caproni aircraft
1950s Italian military trainer aircraft
Low-wing aircraft
Single-engined jet aircraft
Aircraft first flown in 1952